Antonio Milošoski (born January 29, 1976) is a Macedonian politician, former minister of foreign affairs of the Republic of Macedonia from 2006 to 2011 and a member of VMRO-DPMNE.

Early life and education
In 1999, Milošoski graduated from the Faculty of Law of Ss. Cyril and Methodius University in Skopje. In 2002, he did his postgraduate studies at the University of Bonn, Germany, and received his Master on European Integration. 

He commands four foreign languages — Albanian, English, German and Serbian.

Career
He became foreign minister on 28 August 2006 (replacing Ilinka Mitreva). 

He serves as the Head of the OSCE/ODIHR Election Observation Mission for Belarus.

References

External links

Biography of Antonio Milošoski; web site of the Ministry of Foreign Affairs of the Republic of Macedonia

1976 births
Living people
People from Tetovo
University of Bonn alumni
Foreign Ministers of North Macedonia
Ss. Cyril and Methodius University of Skopje alumni
VMRO-DPMNE politicians